The 1962 Buffalo Bulls football team represented the University at Buffalo in the 1962 NCAA University Division football season. The Bulls offense scored 159 points while the defense allowed 148 points.

Schedule

References

Buffalo
Buffalo Bulls football seasons
Buffalo Bulls football